Statistics of Japanese Regional Leagues in the 2019 season.

Champions list

Hokkaido

Tohoku

Kantō

Vertfee Yaita were relegated to the Tochigi Prefectural League, Waseda United were relegated to the Tokyo Metropolitan Prefectural League, and Kanagawa Teachers were relegated to the Kanagawa Prefectural League.

Hokushinetsu

Tokai

 Toyota Industries were relegated to the Aichi Prefectural League, and Ogaki Kogans were relegated to the Gifu Prefectural League.

Kansai

Chūgoku

Shikoku

Kyushu
<onlyinclude>

References
RSSSF

2019
2019 in Japanese football leagues